Uroš Murn (born 9 February 1975) is a Slovenian former professional road bicycle racer, who competed professional from 1997 to 2010.

Born in Novo Mesto, Murn turned professional in 1997 with the Slovenian  squad. In 2000, Murn moved to the Italian  team, where he stayed for four seasons. Early successes in the Tours of Croatia and Slovenia, where Murn won two stages and a stage and the sprints competition respectively, were not matched in later season. Murn took the opportunity to move to the top tier of racing with Phonak in 2004.

On 6 December 2010, it was reported by the Slovenian Press Agency that Uroš Murn decided to end his bicycling career.

Major results

1998
 1st Stage 3 Course Cycliste de Solidarnosc et des Champions Olympiques
 2nd GP Aarhus
 6th Overall Tour de Normandie
1999
 1st GP Krka
 3rd Overall GP Kranj
1st Stage 1
 5th Overall UNIQA Classic
 6th Route Adélie
2000
 Tour of Slovenia
1st Stage 3
1st Sprints classification
 1st Stages 1 & 6a Tour of Croatia
 4th GP Miguel Induráin
 5th Time trial, National Road Championships
 10th Schaal Sels
2001
 4th Coppa Sabatini
 6th Coppa Placci
 8th Coppa Bernocchi
2002
 1st GP Krka
 4th Coppa Placci
 4th Giro dell'Appennino
 7th Coppa Bernocchi
 7th GP Industria & Artigianato di Larciano
 10th Overall Brixia Tour
 10th Giro del Veneto
2003
 1st Stausee Rundfahrt
 1st Foreign Riders classification Giro d'Abruzzo
 2nd US Pro Championship
 5th San Francisco Grand Prix
 5th Giro della Provincia di reggio Calabria
 5th G.P. Costa degli Etruschi
 6th Wachovia Invitational
 8th Giro dell'Appennino
 9th Wachovia Classic
 10th Trofeo Laigueglia
2004
 1st  Road race, National Road Championships
 1st GP Krka
 4th Coppa Sabatini
 7th San Francisco Grand Prix
 8th Paris–Tours
 9th Giro del Piemonte
2005
 1st Stage 1 Setmana Catalana
 9th Paris–Tours
2006
 7th Road race, UCI Road World Championships

Grand Tour general classification results timeline

References

External links

Slovenian male cyclists
1975 births
Living people
Olympic cyclists of Slovenia
Cyclists at the 2000 Summer Olympics
Cyclists at the 2004 Summer Olympics
Sportspeople from Novo Mesto
Slovenian cycling coaches